The Western Thousand Buddha Caves is a Buddhist cave temple site in Dunhuang, Gansu Province, China. The site is located approximately 35 km southwest of the urban centre and about the same distance from the Yangguan Pass; the area served as a staging post for travellers on the Silk Road.  It is the western counterpart of the Mogao Caves, also known as the "Caves of the Thousand Buddhas" after the founding monk Yuezun's vision in 366 of "golden radiance in the form of a thousand Buddhas". The caves were excavated from the cliff that runs along the north bank of the Dang River. A number have been lost to floods and collapse; some forty are still extant. Twenty-two decorated caves house 34 polychrome statues and 800 m2 of wall paintings, dating from the Northern Wei to the late-Yuan and early-Ming Dynasties (sixth to fourteenth centuries). The site was included within the 1961 designation of the Mogao Caves as a Major National Historical and Cultural Site.

Caves

A manuscript from the Library Cave, dating to the Five Dynasties and now at the Bibliothèque nationale in Paris, documents the early history of the site (P 5034): according to the Domain Record of Shazhou Dudu Prefecture – Shouchang County, "60 li east of the county is a very old inscription that says 'Han Dynasty… made a small Buddha niche; the common people gradually built more'". Since Shouchang County, modern Nanhu Village, is the location of the Yangguan Pass along the Hexi Corridor, it is understood that this is a reference to the origins of the Western Thousand Buddha Caves.

The decorated caves are in three main sections: Caves 1–19 at the west end of the cliff, approximately one kilometre from the modern reservoir; Cave 20 in the middle of the site, near the second floodgate; and Caves 21 and 22 at the eastern end of the cliff. Most of the sculptures were restored in a different style during the Qing Dynasty and the Republic of China. The caves at the western end of the site have had aluminium doors and glass partitions installed more recently with the intention of mitigating the environmental causes of deterioration. Some of the paintings at the far east end of the site, distant from the custodians' lodgings, have been detached and remounted in a cave at Mogao. The ruined state of the main Buddha image in Northern Wei Cave 7 enables the construction techniques to be seen: layers of earthen render over an armature of branches and reeds. The loss of upper paint layers also reveals the linear grid used to set out the design of the Thousand Buddhas on the cave walls.

List of caves
The twenty-two caves are dated as follows, based largely on the style of the paintings and their accompanying inscriptions:

See also

 Bhadrakalpikasutra
 Mogao Caves
 Yulin Caves
 Principles for the Conservation of Heritage Sites in China
 National Heritage Sites in Gansu Province
 International Dunhuang Project

References

External links

 Conservation of Ancient Sites on the Silk Road (1st Conference) (GCI)
 Conservation of Ancient Sites on the Silk Road (2nd Conference) (GCI)
  Western Thousand Buddha Caves (Dunhuang Academy) 

Buddhist grottoes in Gansu
Buddhist temples in Jiuquan
Chinese painting
Sites along the Silk Road
Dunhuang
Major National Historical and Cultural Sites in Gansu